Queen B may refer to:

People

Queen Bee, a nickname given in the 1990's to former Junior Mafia member, Lil Kim
Queen B, a nickname for Beyonce and Britney Spears
Queen Bey/Bee, a nickname for Beyonce
Queen B, a nickname for the former queen Beatrix of the Netherlands
Queen B, a nickname for South African TV and Radio personality Bonang Matheba
Queen B, a nickname for Blair Waldorf through high school in the series of Gossip Girl

Entertainment

Music  
"Queen B.", a 2007 song by Puscifer

Television
 Queen B, a 2005 TV movie starring Alicia Silverstone
 "Queen B.", an episode of the TV series Popular
 Queen B. (Arrested Development), the season four episode of Arrested Development TV series

See also 
 Queen bee (disambiguation)